Wallace Camilo (born 10 November 1992) is a Brazilian footballer who currently plays as a midfielder for Friburguense, on loan from Resende.

Career statistics

Club

Notes

References

1992 births
Living people
Brazilian footballers
Association football midfielders
Club Athletico Paranaense players
Duque de Caxias Futebol Clube players
Ceres Futebol Clube players
Resende Futebol Clube players
Friburguense Atlético Clube players
Campeonato Brasileiro Série C players